Mapsidius auspicata is a moth of the family Scythrididae. It was first described by Lord Walsingham in 1907. It is endemic to the Hawaiian islands of Kauai, Oahu, Lanai and Hawaii.

The larvae feed on Charpentiera species. The larva live in a dense white silken tunnel on the leaves of their host.

References

External links

Scythrididae
Endemic moths of Hawaii